Weird Fish may refer to:

Weird Fish (clothing brand)
"Weird Fishes/Arpeggi", a song by Radiohead from their album In Rainbows
Diversity of fish